Tony Batton York (November 27, 1912 in Irene, Texas – April 18, 1970 in Hillsboro, Texas) was a professional baseball player. He played part of one season in Major League Baseball for the Chicago Cubs in 1944 as a shortstop and third baseman.

Personal life 
He was born in Irene, Texas to Theodore York (1888–1942) and his wife Mattie. Tony was the second of their four children, and the only son. His sisters were Juanita M., Lois C., and May W. York. He was married twice, first to Stephanie. They had no children. His second marriage, on January 29, 1941, was to Mariana Norris (November 30, 1915 – July 21, 2009). They had one daughter, Nancy Ann York.

Stephanie born in 1985 was the wife of Tony Batton York's Great Grandson Tony Farmer.

Playing career
York had an extensive career in minor league baseball. He began his career in 1933 with the Baton Rouge Solons in the Dixie League, and continued to play until 1956. In the minors, York was primarily a shortstop, moving to second base full-time in 1947.

York is one of many ballplayers who only appeared in the major leagues during World War II. He made his major league debut on April 18, 1944 (Opening Day) in a road game against the Cincinnati Reds at Crosley Field.

His season and career major league totals for 28 games include a .235 batting average (20-for-85) with 7 runs batted in and 4 runs scored. He was a good fielder for his era, handling 120 out of 125 total chances successfully for a fielding percentage of .960.

In 1952, York became player-manager of the Texarkana Bears in the Big State League. He served as a player-manager for the remainder of his playing career, and continued managing in the minor leagues until 1958.

Death
Tony and his wife are buried in Fairview Cemetery in Hubbard, Texas.

References

External links

Retrosheet

Major League Baseball infielders
Chicago Cubs players
Baton Rouge Solons players
Dallas Steers players
Tulsa Oilers (baseball) players
St. Paul Saints (AA) players
Shreveport Sports players
Milwaukee Brewers (minor league) players
Los Angeles Angels (minor league) players
Seattle Rainiers players
San Diego Padres (minor league) players
Texarkana Bears players
Crowley Millers players
Odessa Eagles players
Ballinger Westerners players
Minor league baseball managers
Baseball players from Texas
1912 births
1970 deaths
People from Hill County, Texas
Carlsbad Potashers players